The seventh season of StarDance (Czech Republic) debuted on Česká televize on October 17, 2015. Ten celebrities were paired with ten professional ballroom dancers. Marek Eben and Tereza Kostková were the hosts for this season.

Couples
The ten professionals and celebrities that competed were:

External links
 Official website

7
2015 Czech television seasons